Chancay is a small city located  north of Lima. Its population is 63,378. The Chancay culture was a pre-Columbian archaeological culture, later part of the Inca Empire.

History 
It was founded in 1562 under the name of Villa de Arnedo.

The main activity in Chancay these days is as a tourist resort for nearby Lima.  The main attraction is El Castillo, a faux castle, recently repaired but constructed in the nineteenth century. There is a small museum in the castle displaying Chancay culture pottery and mummies.

The first dock is expected to open in early 2023 and when finished, the complex will accept up to 1.5 million twenty-foot equivalent unit intermodal containers and 6 million tons of cargo annually.

Gallery

See also
Chancay culture

References

Populated places in the Lima Region
Populated places established in 1562